Brian John Lynch  (born 1936) is a former New Zealand public servant, diplomat, and director of the New Zealand Institute of International Affairs.

Background
Lynch studied at the University of Canterbury where he completed master's degrees in history (1958) and Geography (1962). He was then a secondary teacher for three years.

Public service
Lynch joined the New Zealand Ministry of Foreign Affairs in 1964 where he was successively, Careers and Special Projects Office (1969–1971), Deputy High Commissioner in Singapore (1971–1974), and Head of the Asian and Pacific Division in Wellington (1974–1977). He was involved in the building of the first tentative relationship with Beijing, extricating New Zealand from Vietnam, establishing the new Pacific Forum as a going concern and also in setting up the new Pacific Forum Line. He was Deputy High Commissioner in London (1977–1981) and Assistant Secretary of the Ministry in 1981 and 1982. Lynch was Deputy Secretary of the Ministry of Transport from 1982 to 1992, a decade during which the whole structure of air, rail, road and sea transport was corporatized and eventually privatised as part of the restructuring of the state sector which occurred in those years in New Zealand.

Meat, trade and international affairs
Lynch was the Chief Executive of the Meat Industry Association from 1992 until 2003. "It was for his work in assisting the meat industry to rationalize and adjust to a very different commodity chain in the post-subsidy open market conditions of the 1990s that he was made Officer of the New Zealand Order of Merit in June 2004". He played a major role in debates about the implications of trade liberalization for New Zealand's food industries. He was the foundation chairman of the New Zealand Trade Liberalization Network from October 2001. He was also Chairman of the New Zealand Food Industry Foundation and the New Zealand Horticulture Export Authority and a Senior Adviser and Alternate Member on the New Zealand Asia Pacific Economic Cooperation (APEC) Business Advisory Council. In 2004 Lynch became Director of the New Zealand Institute of International Affairs. He was replaced in 2012 by Peter Kennedy.

Honours
In the 2004 Queen's Birthday Honours, Lynch was appointed an Officer of the New Zealand Order of Merit, for public services and services to the meat industry.

References

External links
 New Zealand Institute of International Affairs.

1936 births
Living people
New Zealand people of Irish descent
University of Canterbury alumni
New Zealand public servants
New Zealand diplomats
Officers of the New Zealand Order of Merit
New Zealand schoolteachers